The 2011 Emirates Melbourne Cup, the 151st running of Australia's most prestigious Thoroughbred horse race, was held on Tuesday, 1 November 2011 at 3:00 pm (AEDT), at Melbourne's Flemington Racecourse. Dunaden won in a photo finish over Red Cadeaux in the closest finish in Melbourne Cup history.

The winning jockey, Frenchman Christophe Lemaire, had arrived in Australia less than a day previously as a late replacement for Craig Williams.

Six out of the first seven finishers were international horses. Third placed Lucas Cranach was the best locally trained finisher and fourth placed was the pre-race favourite, the 2010 winner, Americain.

In related events the federal government's parliamentary question time was brought forward half an hour in order that it would conclude before the race began.

Field
Horses are bred and trained in Australia, unless otherwise indicated. All columns in this table can be sorted by clicking the icons in the top row.

References

External links 
2011 Melbourne Cup

2011
Melbourne Cup
2010s in Melbourne
November 2011 sports events in Australia